St. Peter's Italian Church was a Roman Catholic national parish serving the Italian community in Syracuse, New York. It was merged with the parish of Our Lady of Pompei in 2008.

References 

Roman Catholic Diocese of Syracuse
Roman Catholic churches in Syracuse, New York
Italian-American history
Italian-American culture in New York (state)
Italian-American Roman Catholic national parishes in the United States
Closed churches in New York (state)
Religious organizations established in 1886
2008 disestablishments in New York (state)